Duncan Wu (born 3 November 1961 in Woking, Surrey) is a British academic and biographer.

Biography
Wu received his D.Phil from Oxford University. From 2000-2008, he was Professor of English Language and Literature at St Catherine's College, Oxford. He is now the Raymond Wagner Professor of Literary Studies in the English Department at Georgetown University in Washington DC. Wu joined St Catherine's in 2000 as University Lecturer, and in 2003 became Professor of English Language and Literature. Before that, he was Reader and then Professor of English Literature at the University of Glasgow, 1995–2000, and before that he was a Research Fellow of the British Academy, 1991-4.

His first book, Wordsworth's reading 1770-1799, was published in 1993. His popular textbook, Romanticism: An Anthology, went to a third edition in 2005. Besides several other books about Wordsworth, he has written about contemporary British drama, the fiction of William S. Burroughs, and the non-fiction of Charles Lamb and William Hazlitt. He worked with Alasdair Gray on his Book of Prefaces and is a regular contributor to The Daily Telegraph, The Independent, The Guardian and other British newsprints. His latest volume, William Hazlitt: The First Modern Man, was published by Oxford University Press in the UK on 20 October 2008. He is also Vice-Chairman of The Charles Lamb Society, Trustee of The Keats-Shelley Memorial Association, and a founder member and former Chairman of The Hazlitt Society.

Wu's interests include music, books, and monster trucks.

In other media
In November 2013, Wu was interviewed, as scholar, for the documentary Poetry of Witness, directed by independent filmmakers Billy Tooma and Anthony Cirilo, alongside his Georgetown University colleague, Carolyn Forché.

Partial bibliography
Works written by Wu include:
 Wordsworth's reading 1770-1799 Cambridge University Press, 1993, 
 
 Selected Writings of William Hazlitt (9 vols., 1998)

 Making Plays Macmillan Publishers Limited, 2000,  
 Wordsworth: An Inner Life, Wiley, 2002,  
 Wordsworth's Poets Carcanet, 2006, 
 
Edited

References

External links
 Official University web page

1961 births
People from Woking
Georgetown University faculty
English biographers
Living people
Alumni of St Catherine's College, Oxford
Academics of the University of Oxford
Academics of the University of Glasgow